The Metrotranvía Mendoza (Spanish for Mendoza Light Rail or fast tramway) is a public light rail transport system for the city of Mendoza, Argentina, served by articulated light rail cars operating on newly relaid tracks in former-General San Martín Railway mainline right-of-way.

The  line runs between Mendoza and General Gutierrez in Maipú, on  double-track rail. The Metrotranvía of Mendoza serves the metropolitan area of Mendoza, which includes the departments of Las Heras, Central district, Godoy Cruz, Maipú and Luján de Cuyo. Service operates from 6:00 to 22:00. The line has been named the Línea Verde, or Green Line.  The line operates on the right-hand side as its former U.S. light rail rolling stock is configured, in contrast to the left-handed operation of the majority of the Argentine railway network.

History 
In 2009 the Government of Mendoza Province signed an agreement to build a tram line between the cities of Mendoza and Maipú, at an estimated cost of AR$ 62,449,732. Works were carried out by private companies Construcciones Electromecánicas del Oeste S.A. (CEOSA) and SOGESIC S.A.

An inauguration ceremony was held in February 2012, but service did not begin at that time, as much of the construction work remained to be completed.  Starting on 29 April 2012 passengers were permitted to ride on occasional demonstration/trial services on a portion of the line. The system finally opened for regular service on 8 October 2012.

Future plans 
Construction is currently under way, as of early 2015, to extend the Metrotranvía to Panquehua, in Las Heras, adding an extra  of double track to the original route. The rail for this extension was manufactured in Spain while the concrete sleepers were manufactured in Argentina. This extension includes the construction of new level crossings, as well as the refurbishment of old railway stations. As of April 2018, this new section was projected to open in February 2019.

Another project currently planned will extend the line 4.8 km (3 mi) from Panquehua to El Plumerillo International Airport, and add another 15 km (9.3 mi) branch from the intermediate Godoy Cruz stop to Luján de Cuyo.

Rolling stock 

The service is provided by eleven Siemens–Duewag U2 light-rail vehicles (LRVs) acquired secondhand from the San Diego Trolley system in San Diego, California. By November 2011, about half of these had arrived in Mendoza, and the delivery was completed with the final two cars arriving on 27 April 2012. In 2022, the San Diego Metropolitan Transit System sent another delivery of 39 second-generation trolley cars to Mendoza.

See also 
Rail transport in Argentina
Trolleybuses in Mendoza
Trams in Buenos Aires
Rosario Tramway

References

External links 

 
 Metrotranvía on Sociedad Transporte Mendoza

Light rail in Argentina
Transport in Mendoza Province
Mendoza, Argentina